This is a timeline of the U.S. state of Florida.

Pre-European
 15,405–14,146 BC: Page-Ladson site.
9320 BC: Cutler Fossil Site.
8000 BC: Warm Mineral Springs.
7500 BC: Devil's Den Cave.
5370–5260 BC: Windover Archaeological Site.
3400 BC: Horr's Island burial mounds.
 Various: Populated by indigenous tribes, such as the Apalachee, Timucua, Ais, Calusa, Jaega, Mayaimi, Tequesta and Tocobaga.

1500s
 1502: Florida is mapped on the Cantino map
 1513 April 2: Ponce de Leon is claimed to have discovered Florida.
 1515–1519: Spanish explorers visit Pinellas barrier islands while trading with Tocobaga.
 1528: Panfilo de Narvaez expedition explores the Pinellas Peninsula.
 1538: The horse introduced into Florida
 1539: Hernando de Soto expedition names present Tampa Bay "La Bahia de Espiritu Santo".
 1549: A fleet led by Tristán de Luna y Arellano anchors in Pensacola Bay and sets up the encampment of Puerto de Santa Maria.
 1560: Menéndez commanded the galleons of the great Armada de la Carrera Española Treasure Fleet.
 1564: Fort Caroline north of Jacksonville is established by the French.
 1565: Pedro Menéndez de Avilés establishes the city of St. Augustine.
 1565 September 20: Spanish attack Fort Caroline and kill most of the French, some escape.
 1571 December: Pedro Menéndez wrecks at Cape Canaveral and meets hostile natives thought to be of the Ais Indian Nation.
 1586 June: Sir Francis Drake attacks and sacks St. Augustine.
 1596 March 22: Gonzalo Méndez de Canço appointed Governor and Captain General of Florida.

1600s
 1601: King Philip III of Spain commissioned a map of Florida which includes a fort he wants built in Miami.
 1603: Pedro Ibarra appointed Governor of Florida.
 1605: "Period of Friendship" between Spanish and Native Tribes started because of the diplomatic trip of Alvaro Mexia.

1700s
 1700: Settlers in the Province of Carolina and their Indian allies raid the Ais people.
 1702–1713: Queen Anne's War. Tocobaga virtually annihilated. Raids by English colonists reach Tampa Bay. Pinellas largely deserted.
 1715, July 30: Hurricane causes the sinking of the 1715 Treasure Fleet.
 1743: Spanish established a short-lived mission on Biscayne Bay.
 1739–1748: War of Jenkins' Ear. British mapping expeditions visit Pinellas Peninsula.
 1757: Spanish expedition renames Tampa Bay "La Bahia de San Fernando", after the Spanish king; names entrance to Tampa Bay "La Punta de Pinal de Jimenez" (Point of Pines).
 1763: 
February 10: The French and Indian War ends with the Treaty of Paris being signed. Florida is split into West and East Florida, both territories of Britain
July 20: John Hedges is appointed as the first governor of East Florida.
August 6: Augustine Prévost is appointed as the first governor of West Florida.
 1768: The colony of New Smyrna is established by Dr. Andrew Turnbull.
 1783 
March 10: Final naval battle of the American Revolution fought off Cape Canaveral with Captain John Barry.
 October 3: Treaty of Paris ends American Revolutionary War. Britain cedes Florida to Spain.
 1795: 
October 27: With the Treaty of San Lorenzo, U.S. and Spain recognized the 31st parallel as the northern boundary of Florida.

1800–1842

1810s 
1812: Republic of East Florida.
 1817–1818: First Seminole War.
1819
February 22: Adams–Onís Treaty is signed between Spain and the United States.

1820s 
1821 
February 22: Spain officially cedes Florida to United States as part of the Adams–Onís Treaty.
March 10: Andrew Jackson is appointed military governor of Florida by James Monroe being the first American governor.
July 10: José María Coppinger leaves office as the last governor of East Florida.
July 17: José María Callava the final Spanish and colonial governor of West Florida and Florida as a whole leaves office.
 July 21: Escambia County and St. John's County, Florida's first two counties are established.
December 31: Andrew Jackson leaves office as the  governor of Florida.
 1822 
March 30: Florida Territory is organized combining East Florida and West Florida.
April 17: Florida's first civilian governor, William Pope Duval takes office.
August 12: Jackson and Duval County, Florida's first two counties are formed.
 1824:
 Florida's first true lighthouse built in St. Augustine.
U.S. Army establishes Fort Brooke (later to become Tampa, Florida).
Tallahassee chosen as location of capital (half-way between previous capitals of East and West Florida)
 1825: 
Lighthouse built in St. Augustine.
1827 
January 20: Jefferson County is created.
December 26: Hamilton and Madison County is created.

1830s 
 1832
May 9: U.S. government signs the Treaty of Payne's Landing with some of the Seminole chiefs, promising them lands west of the Mississippi River if they agreed to leave Florida voluntarily
 1834: 
January 25: Territorial Legislature establishes Hillsborough County, Florida.
April 24: John Eaton is appointed Territorial Governor of Florida by Andrew Jackson.
 1835–1842: Second Seminole War.
1836
March 16: Richard K. Call is appointed Territorial Governor of Florida by Andrew Jackson.
 1837: Fort Ann was established on the eastern shore of the Indian River in what is now Brevard County.
1838 
January 26: Calhoun County is established.
1839
December 2: Robert R. Reid is appointed territorial governor of Florida by Martin Van Buren.

1840-45 
 1841
March 19: Richard K. Call is appointed Territorial Governor of Florida.
1842: Armed Occupation Act provides for land grants in unsettled parts of Florida.
1843 
January 27: Hernando County is established.
March 11: Wakulla County is established.
1844 
March 14: Marion and Brevard County are established.
August 11: John Branch is appointed as Governor of Florida being the last territorial governor of the state.

Statehood era (1845–present)

1840s 
1845 
March 3: Florida was admitted to the Union as the 27th U.S. state.
May 26: Florida Legislature is formed succeeding the Florida Territorial Legislative Council.
June 25: Florida's first elected governor, William Dunn Moseley takes office.
1848 January 8: Holmes County is established.
1849 
January 18: Putnam County is established.
January 18: Tampa is first incorporated being a village.

1850s 
1853 
January 8: Sumter County is established.
September 10: Tampa incorporates as a town.
1854
December 29: Volusia County is established.
 1855–1858: Third Seminole War
1855 
January 9: Manatee County is established.
December 15: Liberty County is established. Tampa incorporates as a city.
 1856: Florida Historical Society is incorporated.
1858 
December 21: Suwannee County is established.
December 31: Bradford and Clay County is established.

1860s 
 1861 
January 8 – November 23: Battle of Pensacola occurs, some historians believe this to be the first battle of the American Civil War.
January 10: Florida secedes from the United States.
February 8: Baker and Polk County are established.
April 22: Florida joined the Confederate States of America at the beginning of the Civil War.
October 8: Battle of Santa Rosa Island.
1862 
March 24: Skirmish of the Brick Church.
June 30 – July 1: Battle of Tampa.
October 1–3: Battle of St. John's Bluff.
1863 
October 16–18: Battle of Fort Brooke.
1864 
February 24: Battle of Olustee.
March 1: Skirmish at Cedar Creek.
March 6: Battle of Natural Bridge.
August 17: Battle of Gainesville.
September 7: Battle of Marianna.
1865 
February 20: Battle of Fort Myers.
 1868 
June 28: Florida rejoins the United States.
1869
April 14: Gainesville is incorporated.

1870s 
 1870: Barber–Mizell feud
 1873: 
August 11: Tampa reincorporates a town.
1875:
July 31: Orlando is first incorporated being a town.
1877: Compromise of 1877 completed the withdrawal of U.S. troops from Florida (aftermath of Civil War)

1880s 
 1883 
 May 24: Southern Bell Telephone and Telegraph Company begins operating Florida's first telephone switchboard in Jacksonville.
 December 10: The South Florida Railroad, controlled by Henry B. Plant, becomes the first railroad to arrive in Tampa.
1885
January 1: Lakeland is incorporated.
February 4: Orlando is reincorporated being a city.
March 24: Fort Myers is incorporated.
 1886
 The Great Fire of Key West occurs.
 1887
May 12: Osceola County is established.
May 13: Lee County is established.
May 19: DeSoto County is established.
May 27: Lake County is established.
June 2: Pasco County is established.
July 15: Tampa reincorporates for a 5th and final time as a city.
August 15: Eatonville, Florida, incorporated; the first all-black town to be formed after the Emancipation Proclamation.
 1888 
February 22: President Cleveland's first Florida visit stop.
 February 23: President Cleveland visits Winter Park.
 1889
Legislature created a poll tax

1890s 
 1892
February 29: St. Petersburg is first incorporated being a town.
1894 December: Great Freeze destroys much of Florida's crops (especially citrus).
 1896 
April 15: The Florida East Coast Railway, controlled by Henry Flagler, becomes the first railroad to arrive in Miami.
July 28: Miami is incorporated.

1900s 
1902 
October 14: Sarasota is incorporated as a town.
1903:
May 19: Bradenton is incorporated.
June 6: St. Petersburg reincorporates as a city.
1905 
May 24: St. Lucie County is established.
June 6: Clearwater is incorporated.
1908 
April 5 – May 13: Pensacola streetcar strike of 1908.
November 8: Ocala National Forest established.
November 27: Choctawhatchee National Forest established.
1909
April 30: Palm Beach County is established.

1910s 
1911
March 27: Fort Lauderdale is incorporated.
1912 
January 1: Pinellas County is established.
1913 
April 24: Bay County is established.
April 25: Seminole County is established.
May 13: Sarasota reincorporates as a city.
1914 
April 2: Saint Augustine Fire of 1914
1915 
April 30: Broward County is established.
September 7: Okaloosa County is established.
1917 
April 28: Flagler County is established.
May 8: Okeechobee County is established.

1920s 
 1920s: Florida land boom.
1921 
April 23: Glades, Hardee, Highland and Charlotte County are established.
April 25: Dixie County is established.
May 14: Sarasota County is established.
May 20: Union County is established.
1922
December 14–15: Perry race riot.
1923 
January 1–7: Rosewood massacre.
May 8: Collier County is established.
May 11: Hendry County is established.
1925 
May 26: Boca Raton, Florida is incorporated.
May 30: Martin and Indian River County is established.
June 6: Gulf County is established.
September 10: Hialeah is incorporated.
November 28: Hollywood, Florida is incorporated.
December 4: Gilchrist County is established.
 1928 
 January 25: Overseas Highway opens for cars, connecting Key West to mainland Florida.
 April 26: Tamiami Trail between Tampa and Miami opens to traffic.

1930s 
 1931: 
 gambling legalized, allowing a Parimutuel betting establishment.
 July 10: Osceola National Forest established.
 November – December: Tampa cigar makers' strike of 1931
1936 
May 13: Apalachicola National Forest established.
1937 
November 15: Ku Klux Klan raid of La Paloma nightclub
 repeal of poll tax

1940s 
 1943 September 26: Florida's first oil well is drilled in Collier County by Humble Oil Company.
 1947: Everglades National Park dedicated.
1949 March 21: The first television station in Florida begins broadcasting, WTVJ. It is the 16th TV station to start broadcasting in the United States and is the oldest station still broadcasting in the state.

1950s 

 1950
January 1: Sebring International Raceway opens and holds its first race.
1951
December 25: Murder of Harry and Hariette Moore
1956
May 28 – December 22: Tallahassee bus boycott.
1959 
February 22: Daytona International Speedway opens.
March 31: Busch Gardens Tampa Bay opens.

1960s 
 1960 
August 27: Ax Handle Saturday 
1961
April 27: Port St. Lucie is incorporated.
1962 February 20: Launched from Cape Canaveral, John Glenn orbits the Earth three times with Friendship 7.
1963–1964: St. Augustine movement
1963 
December 29: Hotel Roosevelt fire
1964 
June 18: 1964 Monson Motor Lodge protests
 1966 
 August 6: Miami Dolphins football team plays its first game.
1967
October 1: Jacksonville becomes a consolidated city-county with Duval County.
1968 
Super Bowl II is held at the Miami Orange Bowl between the Green Bay Packers and the Oakland Raiders. It is the first Super Bowl championship to be played in Florida. This is also one of only two Super Bowl championships to be played 2 consecutive years at the same stadium.
May 6 – August 30: Sanitation workers go on strike in St. Petersburg. What begins as a strike later evolves into protests and then rioting.
August 5–8: 1968 Republican National Convention is held in Miami Beach.
August 7–8: 1968 Miami riot.
November 5: Florida ratifies a new constitution.
 1969 July 16: Apollo 11 is launched from Kennedy Space Center, landing the first humans on the moon 4 days later.

1970s 
 1971 October 1: Walt Disney World opens, with Magic Kingdom as its first park.
1972 
July 10–13: 1972 Democratic National Convention is held in Miami Beach.
August 21–23: 1972 Republican National Convention is held in Miami Beach.
 1973 December 15: SeaWorld Orlando opens.
 1974: Big Cypress National Preserve became the first national preserve in the United States National Park System.
1975 January 3: Canaveral National Seashore established.
 1976 September 12: Tampa Bay Buccaneers football team plays its first game.

1980s 
 1980: 
April 15 - October 31: Emigration crisis caused by the Mariel Boatlift from Cuba.
May 17–20: 1980 Miami riots.
June 7: Adventure Island opens.
June 28: Biscayne National Park established.
 1982 October 1: The Walt Disney Company opens its second park in Florida, Epcot.
1984 May 20: Metrorail begins operating in Miami and is the first and only rapid transit/metro system in Florida.
 1985: wreck of the Nuestra Señora de Atocha discovered off Key West, listed in the Guinness Book of World Records as being the most valuable shipwreck to be recovered.
 1988 November 5: Miami Heat plays its first basketball game.
 1989 
 January 16–21: 1989 Miami riot.
May 1: Walt Disney World opens its third park, Disney's Hollywood Studios (originally Disney-MGM Studios).
June 1: Walt Disney World opens its second water park, Disney's Typhoon Lagoon.
 October 13: Orlando Magic plays its first basketball game.

1990s 
1990 
June 7: Universal Studios Florida opens in Orlando.
October 16: Lime Street fire
December 3: 1990 Wynwood riot.
 1992
August: Hurricane Andrew devastated areas of South Florida
October 7: Tampa Bay Lightning hockey team plays its first game.
October 26: Dry Tortugas National Park established.
 1993: 3 professional sports teams are introduced in Florida. Miami Marlins baseball team, Jacksonville Jaguars football team and Florida Panthers hockey team.
1996
October/November: St. Petersburg, Florida riots of 1996
1998 
March 31: Tampa Bay Rays baseball team plays its first game as the Tampa Bay Devil Rays.
April 22: Walt Disney World opens its fourth park, Disney's Animal Kingdom.
 1999 May 28: Universal Studios opens its adjacent park, Islands of Adventure

2000s 
2000 November 7–December 12: Disputed Florida ballots in the United States presidential election delay the results of the overall national result.

2010s 
 2011 October 15: Legoland Florida opens in Lakeland.
2012 July 18–21: 2012 Republican National Convention is held in Tampa.
2014: Florida becomes the United States' third-most populous state.
2016 
May 26–30: 2016 Libertarian National Convention is held in Orlando.
June 12: Pulse nightclub shooting occurs in Orlando, one of the deadliest mass shootings in American history.
 2018 
 February 14: Majory Stoneman Douglas High School shooting occurs, the deadliest high school shooting in United States history.

2020s 
2020
 August 24–27: The date the 2020 Republican National Convention was planned to be held in Jacksonville which was replaced with a virtual online convention.
 2021
 Super Bowl LV is hosted at Raymond James Stadium in Tampa.

See also

 Timelines of cities in Florida

References

Further reading
 

Florida-related lists
 
Florida history
Years in Florida

ang:Stǣr Floridan
fr:Histoire de la Floride
ko:플로리다의 역사
ja:フロリダ州の歴史